The second season of the American crime drama series The Sopranos aired on HBO from January 16 to April 9, 2000. The second season was released on DVD in region 1 on November 6, 2001.

The story of the season focuses on Tony's growing mistrust of one of his closest friends Big Pussy Bonpensiero, who is revealed to be an FBI informant. Dr. Melfi continues meeting with Tony despite her growing disgust with his actions and contemplates the nature of their relationship. Tony's sister Janice also returns to New Jersey, and their collectively strained relationship with their mother Livia and each other continues. 

Meadow is accepted into college, but her personal life intersects with Tony's crime life for the first time. Uncle Junior gets sent to prison again for his crimes. Tony introduces his new enforcer straight from Italy, Furio.  Former boss Jackie Aprile's brother Richie is released from prison and causes trouble for Tony and his business.

Main cast

Cast
 James Gandolfini as Tony Soprano (13 episodes), the underboss of the DiMeo crime family who struggles with keeping his men and family in line.
 Lorraine Bracco as Jennifer Melfi (11 episodes), Tony's former therapist, who is unsure if she wants to take him back.
 Edie Falco as Carmela Soprano (13 episodes), Tony's wife, who begins questioning their relationship.
 Michael Imperioli as Christopher Moltisanti (12 episodes), Tony's cousin by marriage, who is interested in screenwriting.
 Dominic Chianese as Corrado "Junior" Soprano, Jr. (11 episodes), Tony's uncle and the boss in name of the family, struggling under house arrest. 
 Vincent Pastore as Sal "Big Pussy" Bonpensiero (12 episodes), Tony's best friend and a DiMeo soldier who struggles with his loyalty.
 Steven Van Zandt as Silvio Dante (11 episodes), the family's loyal consigliere.
 Tony Sirico as Paul "Paulie Walnuts" Gualtieri (11 episodes), a short-tempered capo.
 Robert Iler as Anthony Soprano, Jr. (10 episodes), Tony's son.
 Jamie-Lynn Sigler as Meadow Soprano (11 episodes), Tony's daughter, who is looking into colleges.
 Nancy Marchand as Livia Soprano (9 episodes), Tony's petulant mother, who he is no longer on speaking terms with.
 Drea de Matteo as Adriana La Cerva (9 episodes), Chris's girlfriend.
 David Proval as Richie Aprile (9 episodes), the late Jackie Aprile's older brother, who quickly falls back into his old ways after being released from prison.
 Aida Turturro as Janice Soprano (12 episodes), Tony's dramatic sister, who comes to town to live with their mother.

Recurring cast

Episodes

Reception

Critical response
The second season of The Sopranos received universal acclaim from critics—garnering a 97 out of 100 on Metacritic, and a 94% approval rating on Rotten Tomatoes. The latter aggregator reports a critical consensus of "The Sopranos strong cast and solid writing add depth to the show's occasionally unlikable characters and their repellent deeds, making for thought-provoking, consistently compelling viewing." Ed Bark of Dallas Morning News wrote, "[It] could be the best TV series of our times. Not for everyone, no. But for what it is, The Sopranos is near magical." 

Steve Johnson of the Chicago Tribune praised the series for accurately portraying human communication, observing how the show reveals "matters of the greatest consequence stem from misunderstandings and misinterpretations." Eric Mink of The New York Times wrote of the show's unique writing and multifaceted characters: "The Sopranos remains a showcase for ferociously distinctive writing, inventive direction and brilliant portrayals of surprisingly, even disturbingly, sympathetic multilayered characters by a perfectly cast group of actors who hold back nothing."

Awards and nominations
52nd Primetime Emmy Awards
Nomination for Outstanding Drama Series
Award for Outstanding Lead Actor in a Drama Series (James Gandolfini) (Episode: "The Happy Wanderer")
Nomination for Outstanding Lead Actress in a Drama Series (Lorraine Bracco) (Episode: "Big Girls Don't Cry")
Nomination for Outstanding Lead Actress in a Drama Series (Edie Falco) (Episode: "Full Leather Jacket")
Nomination for Outstanding Supporting Actor in a Drama Series (Dominic Chianese) 
Nomination for Outstanding Supporting Actress in a Drama Series (Nancy Marchand) (Episodes: "Do Not Resuscitate" + "Funhouse") 
Nomination for Outstanding Directing for a Drama Series (Allen Coulter) (Episode: "The Knight in White Satin Armor")
Nomination for Outstanding Directing for a Drama Series (John Patterson) (Episode: "Funhouse")
Nomination for Outstanding Writing for a Drama Series (David Chase, Todd A. Kessler) (Episode: "Funhouse")
Nomination for Outstanding Writing for a Drama Series (Robin Green, Mitchell Burgess) (Episode: "The Knight in White Satin Armor")

7th Screen Actors Guild Awards
Nomination for Outstanding Performance by an Ensemble in a Drama Series (Entire Cast)
Nomination for Outstanding Performance by a Male Actor in a Drama Series (James Gandolfini)
Nomination for Outstanding Performance by a Female Actor in a Drama Series (Edie Falco)

58th Golden Globe Awards
Nomination for Best Drama Series 
Nomination for Best Actor in a Drama Series (James Gandolfini)
Nomination for Best Actress in a Drama Series (Lorraine Bracco)
Nomination for Best Actress in a Drama Series (Edie Falco)

5th Golden Satellite Awards
Nomination for Best Drama Series
Nomination for Best Actor in a Drama Series (James Gandolfini)
Nomination for Best Actress in a Drama Series (Edie Falco)

Writers Guild of America Awards 2000
Nomination for Best Drama Episode (Mitchell Burgess, Robin Green) (Episode: "The Knight in White Satin Armor")
Nomination for Best Drama Episode (Terence Winter) (Episode: "Big Girls Don't Cry")

Directors Guild of America Awards
Nomination for Outstanding Directing for a Drama Series (Henry J. Bronchtein) (Episode: "From Where to Eternity")
Nomination for Outstanding Directing for a Drama Series (Allen Coulter) (Episode: "The Knight in White Satin Armor")
Nomination for Outstanding Directing for a Drama Series (John Patterson) (Episode: "Funhouse")

16th TCA Awards
Nomination for Program of the Year
Nomination for Outstanding Achievement in Drama
Award for Outstanding Individual Achievement in Drama (James Gandolfini)

References

External links 
 
 

Season 2
2000 American television seasons